Lodi is a borough in Bergen County, in the U.S. state of New Jersey. As of the 2020 United States census, the borough's population was 26,206, an increase of 2,070 (+8.6%) from the 2010 census count of 24,136, which in turn reflected an increase of 165 (+0.7%) from the 23,971 counted in the 2000 census.

Lodi owes its name to the Italian city of Lodi, Lombardy. It was incorporated as a borough on December 22, 1894, from portions of the now-defunct municipalities of Lodi Township (now South Hackensack) and Saddle River Township (now Saddle Brook), at the height of Bergen County's "Boroughitis" phenomenon then sweeping through Bergen County, based on the results of a referendum held on the previous day.

Geography
According to the United States Census Bureau, the borough had a total area of 2.29 square miles (5.93 km2), including 2.27 square miles (5.89 km2) of land and 0.02 square miles (0.05 km2) of water (0.74%). Areas of the borough are prone to flooding during heavy rain.

The borough borders the Bergen County municipalities of Garfield, Hackensack, Hasbrouck Heights, Maywood, Rochelle Park, Saddle Brook, South Hackensack and Wood-Ridge.

Demographics

2010 census

The Census Bureau's 2006–2010 American Community Survey showed that (in 2010 inflation-adjusted dollars) median household income was $55,541 (with a margin of error of ±$3,430) and the median family income was $65,494 (±$4,924). Males had a median income of $49,002 (±$4,353) versus $37,108 (±$5,243) for females. The per capita income for the borough was $25,910 (±$1,786). About 10.1% of families and 12.9% of the population were below the poverty line, including 20.4% of those under age 18 and 15.5% of those age 65 or over.

Same-sex couples headed 64 households in 2010, an increase from the 44 counted a decade earlier.

2000 census
As of the 2000 United States census there were 23,971 people, 9,528 households, and 6,097 families residing in the borough. The population density was 10,590.6 people per square mile (4,095.2/km2). There were 9,908 housing units at an average density of 4,377.4 per square mile (1,692.7/km2). The racial makeup of the borough was 78.16% White, 3.55% African American, 0.17% Native American, 8.86% Asian, 0.03% Pacific Islander, 6.25% from other races, and 2.97% from two or more races. Hispanic or Latino of any race were 17.98% of the population.

There were 9,528 households, out of which 28.9% had children under the age of 18 living with them, 45.6% were married couples living together, 13.4% had a female householder with no husband present, and 36.0% were non-families. Of all households 30.1% were made up of individuals, and 10.9% had someone living alone who was 65 years of age or older. The average household size was 2.50 and the average family size was 3.16.

In the borough the population was spread out, with 21.3% under the age of 18, 8.2% from 18 to 24, 34.5% from 25 to 44, 21.2% from 45 to 64, and 14.9% who were 65 years of age or older. The median age was 36 years. For every 100 females, there were 90.4 males. For every 100 females age 18 and over, there were 87.0 males.

The median income for a household in the borough was $43,421, and the median income for a family was $51,959. Males had a median income of $38,781 versus $31,253 for females. The per capita income for the borough was $21,667. About 5.3% of families and 8.0% of the population were below the poverty line, including 9.9% of those under age 18 and 9.8% of those age 65 or over.

Government

Local government
Lodi operates under the 1923 Municipal Manager Law form of New Jersey municipal government. The borough is one of 7 municipalities (of the 564) statewide that use this form of government. The governing body is comprised of five members who are elected at-large on a non-partisan basis as part of the May municipal election to serve four-year terms of office on a concurrent basis. A mayor and deputy mayor are selected by the council from among its members. 

The council is an exclusively legislative body, with responsibility for day-to-day operation of the borough assigned to a manager who acts as the municipal chief executive and executes laws and policies, prepares the budget for council consideration and attends and participates at meetings with a voice, but no vote. The manager recommends improvements and implements those approved, as well as oversees contracts and franchises and reports violations. It is the responsibility of the manager to appoint and remove department heads and make all additional appointments not made by the council.

, members of the Lodi Township Council are Mayor Scott A. Luna, Deputy Mayor Vincent Martin, Emil Carafa Jr., Albert DiChiara, and Joseph P. Leto IV, all of whom were initially elected in May 2019, and serve terms of office that expire on June 30, 2023.

Marc N. Schrieks was appointed to a two-year term as Municipal Manager on September 1, 2021.

In January 2016, the Township Council appointed Albert DiChiara to fill the seat vacated by Bruce Masopust when he took office as Borough Manager; DiChiara will serve until a special vote held as part of the November 2016 general election.

In February 2015, the township council selected Emil Carafa Jr., to fill the vacant council seat of Mayor Marc Schrieks, who left office to take a position in the administration of County Executive James J. Tedesco III, while Bruce Masopust was chosen to succeed Schrieks in his role as mayor.

Schrieks was elected by the council as mayor on July 1, 2008, and served until June 30, 2009, making him the youngest person to ever serve as its Mayor. Karen Viscana was the first woman in Lodi history to serve as mayor when she was sworn into office in 2008.

Federal, state, and county representation
Lodi is located in the 9th Congressional District and is part of New Jersey's 38th state legislative district. 

In redistricting following the 2010 census, the borough was in the 5th congressional district, which was in effect from 2013 to 2022. Prior to the 2010 Census, Lodi had been part of the 9th Congressional District, a change made by the New Jersey Redistricting Commission that took effect in January 2013, based on the results of the November 2012 general elections.

Politics
As of March 2011, there were a total of 11,177 registered voters in Lodi, of which 4,043 (36.2% vs. 31.7% countywide) were registered as Democrats, 1,324 (11.8% vs. 21.1%) were registered as Republicans and 5,805 (51.9% vs. 47.1%) were registered as Unaffiliated. There were 5 voters registered as Libertarians or Greens. Among the borough's 2010 Census population, 46.3% (vs. 57.1% in Bergen County) were registered to vote, including 58.9% of those ages 18 and over (vs. 73.7% countywide).

In the 2016 presidential election, Democrat Hillary Clinton received 5,395 votes (60.6% vs. 54.2% countywide), ahead of Republican Donald Trump with 3,241 votes (36.4% vs. 41.1%) and other candidates with 266 votes (3.0% vs. 4.6%), among the 9,003 ballots cast by the borough's 13,318 registered voters, for a turnout of 67.6% (vs. 72.5% in Bergen County). In the 2012 presidential election, Democrat Barack Obama received 5,420 votes (67.2% vs. 54.8% countywide), ahead of Republican Mitt Romney with 2,508 votes (31.1% vs. 43.5%) and other candidates with 56 votes (0.7% vs. 0.9%), among the 8,070 ballots cast by the borough's 12,305 registered voters, for a turnout of 65.6% (vs. 70.4% in Bergen County). 

In the 2008 presidential election, Democrat Barack Obama received 5,174 votes (59.7% vs. 53.9% countywide), ahead of Republican John McCain with 3,358 votes (38.7% vs. 44.5%) and other candidates with 70 votes (0.8% vs. 0.8%), among the 8,667 ballots cast by the borough's 11,983 registered voters, for a turnout of 72.3% (vs. 76.8% in Bergen County). In the 2004 presidential election, Democrat John Kerry received 4,696 votes (57.9% vs. 51.7% countywide), ahead of Republican George W. Bush with 3,344 votes (41.2% vs. 47.2%) and other candidates with 52 votes (0.6% vs. 0.7%), among the 8,115 ballots cast by the borough's 11,598 registered voters, for a turnout of 70.0% (vs. 76.9% in the whole county).

In the 2013 gubernatorial election, Republican Chris Christie received 52.0% of the vote (2,135 cast), ahead of Democrat Barbara Buono with 46.9% (1,924 votes), and other candidates with 1.1% (46 votes), among the 4,256 ballots cast by the borough's 11,672 registered voters (151 ballots were spoiled), for a turnout of 36.5%. In the 2009 gubernatorial election, Democrat Jon Corzine received 2,651 ballots cast (56.2% vs. 48.0% countywide), ahead of Republican Chris Christie with 1,834 votes (38.9% vs. 45.8%), Independent Chris Daggett with 173 votes (3.7% vs. 4.7%) and other candidates with 33 votes (0.7% vs. 0.5%), among the 4,720 ballots cast by the borough's 11,546 registered voters, yielding a 40.9% turnout (vs. 50.0% in the county).

Emergency services
The Lodi Police Department operates out of the Borough Hall. The police department has 47 sworn officers. The department is broken into several Divisions including; Patrol Division, Detective Division, Records, Traffic, and Operation/Community Policing. The current Department's Chief of Police is Acting Chief Donald Scorzetti.

The Fire Department is staffed by approximately 81 volunteer firefighters belonging to four different companies located at three different fire houses throughout the borough. Steven Cassiello of Hose Company # 2 is the Chief of Department, Moses Owen of Rescue Truck Company # 1 is 1st Assistant Chief, Nelson Garzon of Hose Company # 1 is the 2nd Assistant Chief, and Micheal Lortz of Fire Company # 1 is 3rd Assistant Chief. The Lodi Fire Department is equipped with six pieces of apparatus (three engines, one ladder, one rescue, one foam truck) at the following locations:

 Fire Company # 1, which is located on Westervelt Place, houses Engine 612 and Foam Unit 616
 Fire Headquarters, which houses Hose Company #1 and Rescue Truck Co # 1, located on Graham Lane, houses Engine 615, Ladder 613, and Rescue 611
 Hose Company # 2, which is located on Kennedy Drive, houses Engine 614

Each Firehouse is equipped with a rescue boat for flood and water rescue emergencies.

The Lodi Fire Department responds to about 500+ calls per year, including mutual aid to neighboring municipalities including Garfield, Saddle Brook, Hasbrouck Heights, Rochelle Park, Maywood, Elmwood Park, Wallington and other South Bergen towns when needed.

The Lodi Volunteer Ambulance and Rescue Squad was established in 1962. Brianna Perrelli is the captain and Kaetlynn Ayala is the president. LVARS renders aid with three Type III ambulances; EMS 1, 2, and 3, as well as a Fire Rehab Unit (Rehab 4). LVARS responds to roughly 2,000 requests for aid per year.

Education
The Lodi Public Schools serve students in pre-kindergarten through twelfth grade. As of the 2018–19 school year, the district, comprised of seven schools, had an enrollment of 3,237 students and 231.0 classroom teachers (on an FTE basis), for a student–teacher ratio of 14.0:1. Schools in the district (with 2018–19 enrollment data from the National Center for Education Statistics) are
Columbus Elementary School with 221 students in grades K–5, 
Hilltop Elementary School with 347 students in grades Pre-K–5, 
Roosevelt Elementary School with 173 students in grades Pre-K–5, 
Washington Elementary School with 366 students in grades Pre-K–5, 
Wilson Elementary School with 331 students in grades Pre-K–5, 
Thomas Jefferson Middle School with 719 students in grades 6–8 and 
Lodi High School with 864 students in grades 9–12.

Bergen Arts and Science Charter School serves public school students from Lodi, as well as those from Garfield and Hackensack.

Public school students from the borough, and all of Bergen County, are eligible to attend the secondary education programs offered by the Bergen County Technical Schools, which include the Bergen County Academies in Hackensack, and the Bergen Tech campus in Teterboro or Paramus. The district offers programs on a shared-time or full-time basis, with admission based on a selective application process and tuition covered by the student's home school district.

Immaculate Conception High School is an all-girls college-preparatory high school founded in 1915 by the Felician Sisters that operates under the jurisdiction of the Roman Catholic Archdiocese of Newark. Felician College, an independent Catholic institution, is located in Lodi, and also has a satellite campus in nearby Rutherford that opened in '97.

Transportation

Roads and highways

Route 17, U.S. Route 46 and Interstate 80 pass through Lodi.

Public transportation
NJ Transit bus routes 144, 161 and 164 offer service between the borough and the Port Authority Bus Terminal in Midtown Manhattan, while 709, 712 and 780 provide local service.

In the past Lodi was served by the Lodi Branch Railroad and its successor, the Hackensack and Lodi Railroad, both associated with the Erie Railroad.

In media and popular culture
Lodi is home to the transmitter and towers for New York radio station WABC.

In the HBO crime drama The Sopranos, the Satin Dolls go-go bar in Lodi was used as the filming location for the fictional Bada Bing bar. Lodi High School, various stores and houses, and Route 17 in the borough were also featured as the series was largely filmed on location in North Jersey.

Notable people

People who were born in, residents of, or otherwise closely associated with Lodi include:
 Frederick Behne (1873–1918), fireman first class serving in the United States Navy who received the Medal of Honor for bravery
 Joan Berger (1933–2021), infielder and outfielder who played in the All-American Girls Professional Baseball League
 Frank Cannova (1911–2005), hotelier, businessman and entrepreneur
 Richard Cottingham (born 1946), convicted serial killer and rapist nicknamed The Torso Killer and Times Square Torso Ripper
 James Guarantano (born 1969), former wide receiver for the NFL's San Diego Chargers and the CFL's Baltimore Stallions
 Jarrett Guarantano (born 1997), American football quarterback for the Arizona Cardinals.
 Howie Janotta (1924–2010), basketball player who played for the Baltimore Bullets
 Joe Maniaci (1914–1996), football player and coach who played in the National Football League (NFL) with the Brooklyn Dodgers and the Chicago Bears
 Dean Obeidallah (born 1969), comedian
 Louis Ricco (born 1929), caporegime of the Gambino crime family
 Rich Skrosky (born 1964), football player and coach
 Nathan Sonenshein (1915–2001), rear admiral in the United States Navy
 Bobby "Werner" Strete (born 1966 as Robert Ahrendt), bass player for indie rock bands Mod Fun and Crocodile Shop
 Spann Watson (1916–2014), Tuskegee Airman

Several members of the punk rock band, Misfits, as well as several associated acts, were Lodi residents, including:
 Glenn Danzig (born 1955), singer and songwriter. Also singer and songwriter in the bands Samhain and Danzig
 Jerry Only (born 1959), bass player and vocalist
 Doyle Wolfgang von Frankenstein (born 1964), guitarist
 Dr. Chud (Born 1964), former drummer 
 Mr. Jim (born 1954), former drummer
 Franché Coma (born 1957), former guitarist
 Eerie Von (born 1964), former bass guitar player for Samhain and Danzig
 Steve Zing (born 1964), former drummer for Samhain and The Undead, bassist for Danzig

Chemical plant explosion

In April 1995 the Napp Technologies chemical plant in downtown Lodi suffered an explosion killing workers and injuring others in the area of the plant.  The plant was owned by the Sackler family.

References

Sources
 Municipal Incorporations of the State of New Jersey (according to Counties) prepared by the Division of Local Government, Department of the Treasury (New Jersey); December 1, 1958.
 Clayton, W. Woodford; and Nelson, William. History of Bergen and Passaic Counties, New Jersey, with Biographical Sketches of Many of its Pioneers and Prominent Men. Philadelphia: Everts and Peck, 1882.
 Harvey, Cornelius Burnham (ed.), Genealogical History of Hudson and Bergen Counties, New Jersey. New York: New Jersey Genealogical Publishing Co., 1900.
 Van Valen, James M. History of Bergen County, New Jersey. New York: New Jersey Publishing and Engraving Co., 1900.
 Westervelt, Frances A. (Frances Augusta), 1858–1942, History of Bergen County, New Jersey, 1630–1923, Lewis Historical Publishing Company, 1923.

External links

 Lodi official website
 Lodi Public Schools
 Lodi Library website
 
 School Data for the Lodi Public Schools, National Center for Education Statistics
 FUSRAP Maywood Superfund Site—within the boundaries of Maywood, but affects neighboring towns also

 
1894 establishments in New Jersey
1923 Municipal Manager Law
Boroughs in Bergen County, New Jersey
Populated places established in 1894